Salt desert of Sirjan is a salt field in Iran that appears after arrival of a flood tide and evaporates. It is a huge field of soluble salt. It is one of the most beautiful and unique places in Iran.

The salt desert of Sirjan is located about 27 kilometers from the Sirjan to Shiraz road near Kheirabad village. The field covers more than 35,000 hectares. Occasionally, rain turns it into a salt lake.

People go there in the middle of the month by the Lunar calendar to watch the full moon rise and celebrate the time.

The salt factory established near this place uses this salt to produce edible salt. This plain covered mainly by wind sediments in the form of sand hill that is seen evaporating sediments such as salt and land plaster. Vegetation in area is very poor because of high temperature evaporation and poor soil.

This area is polluted and damaged because of the waste and garbage of the near iron factory.

References

Landforms of Iran
Sirjan County
Landforms of Kerman Province
Salt flats
Tourist attractions in Kerman Province